is a suspense visual novel developed and published by 5pb. for the PlayStation 3 and Xbox 360. The game was released in Japan on September 15, 2011, featuring five chapters and five main characters. A port for the PlayStation Portable was released on July 26, 2012.  The sequel title, Disorder 6, was released on August 22, 2013. It is the first title in Suspense-fiction Adventure series.

Gameplay 
Dunamis15 uses a game system called "multi site system," which has the player switch off between main characters depending on where their player is in the story. Time in the game will loop, so the player will end up experiencing the same story repeatedly. The player will need to follow the proper route in order to escape from this loop.

The game has five chapters, each told from the perspective of a different main character.

Plot

Setting 
Dunamis15 is set in a world slightly in the future where a nuclear explosion has caused genetic mutations. All the students at Ceres Academy are clones who were created as materials for cloning technology research. Certain events that transpired caused the students to rebel.

Story 
Tōgo Takatsuki is leading a boring life at Ceres Academy, located on an isolated island called Dunamis Base. One day, while rushing to class after having overslept, Tōgo stumbles upon a mysterious girl in the school hallway. This brief encounter then changes Tōgo's life forever.

Characters 

Tōgo has the highest grade at Dunamis Base. He's scheduled to graduate next year, but has yet to have a clear vision for the future.

Nanao likes to sneak into the girl's dorm. He's popular amongst the female students and will interact with any girl.

Ichika is an excellent student. She's humorous and is well liked by male students and teachers. She has no particular concern.

Manami is a precocious girl who wants to fall in love. It seems that she will be going after Tōgo.

Chihaya is an exchange student from the main island. Due to a genetic mutation, her growth has stopped. She is described as a "cool girl".

Music 
The game's opening theme is  performed by Asriel's Kokomi and the ending theme is Promised Land by Asami Imai. There is also a "grand ending";  by Naomi Tamura.

Releases 
Following the game's release for the PlayStation 3 and Xbox 360 on September 15, 2011, a version for the PlayStation Portable was released on July 26, 2012. The PSP version includes new features and additional "past and future" episodes of the story.

References

External links 
  
 Official debut trailer 
 

2011 video games
Japan-exclusive video games
Suspense-fiction Adventure
PlayStation 3 games
PlayStation Portable games
Xbox 360 games
Video games developed in Japan
Visual novels